HMS Cayman (K506) was a Colony-class frigate of the United Kingdom that served during World War II. She originally was ordered by the United States Navy as the Tacoma-class patrol frigate USS Harland (PF-78) and was transferred to the Royal Navy prior to completion.

Construction and acquisition
The ship, originally designated a "patrol gunboat," PG-186, was ordered by the United States Maritime Commission under a United States Navy contract as USS Harland. She was reclassified as a "patrol frigate," PF-78, on 15 April 1943 and laid down by the Walsh-Kaiser Company at Providence, Rhode Island, on 15 July 1943.  Intended for transfer to the United Kingdom, the ship was renamed Cayman by the British prior to launching and was launched on 6 September 1943.

Service history
Transferred to the United Kingdom under Lend-Lease on 20 January 1944, the ship served in the Royal Navy as HMS Cayman (K506) on patrol and escort duty.

Disposal
The United Kingdom returned Cayman to the U.S. Navy on 23 April 1946. She was sold to the United Dock Corporation of New York, New York, on 1 July 1947 for scrapping.

References 
Notes

Bibliography
 Navsource Online: Frigate Photo Archive HMS Cayman (K 506) ex-Harland ex-PF-78 ex-PG-186

1943 ships
Ships built in Providence, Rhode Island
Tacoma-class frigates
Colony-class frigates
World War II frigates and destroyer escorts of the United States
World War II frigates of the United Kingdom